The butterfly splitfin or butterfly goodeid, Ameca splendens, is a bony fish from the monotypic genus Ameca
of the splitfin family (Goodeidae). It was formerly found throughout the Ameca River drainage in Mexico; the type locality is Rio Teuchitlán in the vicinity of Teuchitlán, Jalisco. The species was only ever found in an area about 10 miles (15 km) in diameter.

Today, the species is rated as critically endangered by the IUCN. A remnant population has been found to persist in El Rincón waterpark near the town of Ameca. Possibly, it also exists in a feral state in the United States; individuals apparently derived from escaped or introduced captive stock were met with in southeastern Nevada. For some time, it was a popular fish among aquarists, but hobbyist stocks have declined recently, placing its survival in jeopardy.

Description

As its common name implies, it is indeed quite an attractive fish. A dominant mature male specimen a large dorsal fin which like the caudal fin is washed with black. A yellow band stretches along the caudal's back margin. The body of both sexes is ochre, with silvery sides and a brownish back, which in males usually have numerous glittering metallic scales. Females and immatures having black dots on the sides and ochre fins. The fins of males intensify in color when they are excited, and depending on their mood, they can show more or less strongly a black band along the side. For the first two weeks or so after birth, the young are entirely silvery.

Males can also be told apart from females because their anal fin's front part splits off and transforms to a blunt, flexible andropodium used for mating. As usual in live-bearers, males are the smaller sex, reaching some 3 in (7–8 cm) total length at best, with females being able to grow up to 4 in (10 cm) under good conditions.

Ecology
In its former natural habitat, the bedrock is limestone, resulting in a hard and alkaline water with a general hardness of 6-10 dGH, while the temporary (carbonate) hardness is usually between 7 and 11°. The pH is around 8, and temperature varies little between the seasons, but ranges between about 70 and 85 °F (20 and 30 °C) between day and night. The vegetation is largely limited to algae and Ceratophyllum hornworts. The remnant wild population coexists with the native blackfin goodea (Goodea atripinnis) and Lerma live-bearer (Poeciliopsis infans), as well as with the common molly (Poecilia sphenops), Oreochromis tilapias, and the bluegill (Lepomis macrochirus) which presumably have all been introduced.

Among groups of A. splendens, a loose dominance hierarchy develops, in particular in confined environments. Males chase each other about, with the dominant male(s) showing the most splendid coloration. Submissive males will try to retreat from attacks, typically towards the surface, and may shake their head as a calming signal.

Like other Goodeidae, butterfly splitfins mate by internal fertilization and spawn fully developed young. The females become sexually mature at about six months of age and can give birth every six to 10 weeks according to the water temperature and the condition of the fish. Mating is preceded by a courtship, where the males present themselves to the females with their heads pointing downwards – up to 45° from horizontal – and shake the forward part of their bodies. In that respect, they resemble the jeweled splitfin (Xenotoca variata); they do not have a ritualized "courtship dance" as some other splitfins, but the male sometimes rotates to present either flank to the female. The females respond by shaking their heads.

The fry when born can be up to 0.8 in (20 mm) in length, as the females feed the unborn young via trophotaenia which have a similar function as the umbilical cord in humans.

As a pet

The butterfly splitfin has a reputation of being a fin nipper, but being a large and robust fish, it will certainly bully small and delicate species like guppies or small tetras. When housed with less tender species that require similar conditions, it is a great fish for any tank type; even the hardier species of Apistogramma and similar dwarf cichlids make good companions, with water parameters compromising between the splitfins' and the cichlids' requirements at a point similar to most tap water.

A. splendens thrives best in clean, well-aerated water, at temperatures around 70-75 °F (20-25 °C) and neutral or slightly higher pH, with water hardness between 5 and 10 dGH composed mainly from calcium hardness. They do not tolerate overly low pH and too soft water, and are unsuitable for dedicated rainforest aquaria with low pH and almost-zero hardness (e.g. for most tetras or danionins). Butterfly splitfins are strong swimmers and social fish; they dwell in groups of three to five males and three to seven females in large tanks where they can grow to full size. In small tanks, they stay small, and fewer individuals or no other fish should be kept. Their overall effect on plant growth is beneficial as they keep down algae and clean off detritus. A. splendens breeds quite readily in the aquarium; some floating plants such as Ceratopteris or Ceratophyllum provide protection for young fry.

Aggressiveness varies with population density; at high population densities, tank decoration is highly significant in influencing behavior. At least among captive populations, butterfly splitfins become more aggressive if much decoration is placed in the tank.

Butterfly splitfins are voracious, and eat most forms of commercial fish food. They take live prey up to the size of week-old guppy fry, but need plant material, ideally green algae, to thrive. They are ideal algae eaters for tanks with small, hard-water cichlids. If not enough algae are available, vegetables such as lettuce, spinach, or green peas are recommended additions to the diet. Fry do not need "baby" food such as brine shrimp or nauplia, though as in adults, plant food increase growth and vitality.

Lighting should be strong, to encourage growth of algae; direct sunlight is ideal. In summer, they can be kept in outside tanks, basins, or small ponds in temperate and warmer areas; they can tolerate overnight air temperatures of 60 °F (15 °C) well enough, but should be protected from birds, cats, and other predators.

Many zoos and public aquariums maintain colonies of the species.

References

Sources
  (2006): Ameca splendens. USGS Nonindigenous Aquatic Species Database. Gainesville, FL. Revision Date: 12/5/2003. Retrieved 2006-NOV-09.
  (2006): Captive breeding promotes aggression in an endangered Mexican fish. Biological Conservation 133(2): 169–177.  (HTML abstract)
  (1971): Ameca splendens, a New Genus and Species of Goodeid Fish from Western Mexico, with Remarks on the Classification of the Goodeidae. Copeia 1971(1): 1–13.  (HTML abstract and first page image)
  [2005]: Give Ameca splendens a Try. PDF fulltext

External links
 Photo of displaying males
 Photo of juvenile

Goodeinae

Freshwater fish of Mexico
Endemic fish of Mexico
Endangered biota of Mexico
Fish described in 1971